Arseny Sergeyevich Bondarev (born 9 April 1985) is a Russian former professional ice hockey player. Bondarev was drafted by the New Jersey Devils in the 9th round, 292nd overall in the 2003 NHL Entry Draft.

Career
Bondarev began his career with Lokomotiv Yaroslavl-2 in the Pervaya Liga in 2001. He then went over to Amur Khabarovsk-2 in 2004, and played 3 games for the second team in the Pervaya Liga, and 33 games with the top team in the Vysshaya Liga. He continued playing for Khabarovsk until he joined Krylya Sovetov Moscow for the 2006–07 season. 

Bondarev played 5 games for the second team in the Pervaya Liga, and 15 games for the top team in the Russian Superleague. His stay with Krylya only lasted one year, and he joined HC MVD for the 2007–08 season. Bondarev played 36 games in the Russian Superleague for MVD in 2007–08. For 2008–09, Bondarev played 13 games for HC MVD-2 in the Pervaya Liga, before going to Kristall Elektrostal in the Vysshaya Liga. 

After half a season with Elektrostal, he joined Dizel Penza, and played 51 games with them in 2009–10. For 2010–11, Bondarev joined HC Gomel of the Belarusian Extraliga, and played in 35 games. He returned to Russia for the 2011–12 season, and joined Molot-Prikamie Perm in the Vysshaya Liga. He then spent a season playing for Kristall Saratov in 2013-14, followed by a stint with HC Ryazan in 2014-15 and finally Sokol Krasnoyarsk in 2015-16.

Career statistics

Regular season and playoffs

International

References

External links

1985 births
Living people
Amur Khabarovsk players
Bisons de Neuilly-sur-Marne players
Dizel Penza players
HK Gomel players
Kristall Elektrostal players
Kristall Saratov players
Krylya Sovetov Moscow players
Lokomotiv Yaroslavl players
HC MVD players
Molot-Prikamye Perm players
New Jersey Devils draft picks
Russian ice hockey left wingers
HC Ryazan players
Sokil Kyiv players
Sokol Krasnoyarsk players